Sylvester Joe (unknown – 1839), hunter and explorer, born Baie d'Espoir, Newfoundland. Joe, a native Mi'kmaq of Newfoundland, was the noted hunter from the south-west coast of the island of Newfoundland who was engaged by William Cormack to guide him on his trek across Newfoundland, the first European Canadian to do so.

In his writings William Cormack refers to him as Joseph Sylvester, it would appear that he had reversed the name inadvertently, as Joe is a common first name in this area of Newfoundland while Sylvester is unknown as a surname among Newfoundland Mi'kmaq.

Joe can be credited for much of the success of Cormack's venture which began at Smith Sound, Trinity Bay and ended at St. George's Bay on the west coast of the Island. This cross island expedition was undertaken by just Joe and Cormack in search of the declining population of the native Beothuk and to also explore the interior of the Island.

On September 10, 1822, five days into their journey, Cormack immortalized Joe by naming Mount Sylvester in his honour. When Joe realized the immensity of the task at hand, he suggested to Cormack that they abandon their expedition and head south to his home town of Baie d'Espoir. Cormack convinced him to continue by drawing up a new contract on September 14.  The contract reads as follows: 
I promise and agree with Joseph Silvester that if he accompanies me from St. John's to St. George's Bay by land ... besides what I may have already done for him, that after he takes me safe there, that I will on our return, give his mother one barrel of flour, one barrel of pork and anything else that may be found suitable, and further, that he is to go along with me to England or Scotland and stay there as long as I do, or if he likes he may return to St. John's with me next year, or if he likes I will give him passage ... to Portugal or Spain in order that it might do his health good. If Joe should ever go to Prince Edward Island I will give him a letter to my friends there to do what they can for him... "B.D. Fardy (1985)"

Despite the many hardships and their personal conflicts the pair continued the cross island journey and reached their destination on November 4.  Joe spent the winter in St. George's.  From then on little is known of Sylvester Joe.

References

Further reading

 Cormack, W. E. Report of Mr. W.E. Cormack's Journey in Search of the Red Indians in Newfoundland Read Before the Bœothick Institution of St. John's, Newfoundland. S.l: s.n, 1828.  
 Cormack, W. E. Narrative of a Journey Across the Island of Newfoundland. St. John's, Nfld.?: s.n.], 1856.

External links
Biography at the Dictionary of Canadian Biography Online

1868 deaths
19th-century First Nations people
Canadian explorers
Mi'kmaq people
Newfoundland Colony people
People from Newfoundland (island)
Persons of National Historic Significance (Canada)
Year of birth missing